Presidencia Roque Sáenz Peña Airport is a public use airport located  northwest of Presidencia Roque Sáenz Peña, a city in the Chaco Province of Argentina.

The non-directional beacon (Ident: PSP) is located on the field.

See also

Transport in Argentina
List of airports in Argentina

References

External links 
OpenStreetMap

FallingRain - Termal Airport

Airports in Argentina
Chaco Province